Sergey Saychik (26 February 1957 – 5 October 2000) was a Soviet ski jumper. He competed in the normal hill and large hill events at the 1976 Winter Olympics.

References

1957 births
2000 deaths
Soviet male ski jumpers
Olympic ski jumpers of the Soviet Union
Ski jumpers at the 1976 Winter Olympics
Sportspeople from Perm, Russia